Abraham Josué Avalos Ceja (born January 29, 1991, in Jiquilpan, Michoacán) is a Mexican footballer who plays as a forward for Irapuato FC. Abraham is also in Irapuato's Youth Team Along with his teammate Gustavo Guillen However both are frequently used in the first team. he is called Pachu by fans.

Career
Avalos made his senior team debut on April 4, 2012, versus La Piedad in a 3–0 loss, wearing #55 on his shirt. he scored his first goal with Irapuato's senior team on March 24, 2012, versus Lobos BUAP in a 2–0 win, in that game he scored the two goals and he made the first goal 30 meters out. Avalos is still Playing for Irapuato's youth team in the Liga de Nuevos Talentos alongside his teammate Gustavo Guillen .

Club statistics

External links
  

1991 births
Living people
People from Jiquilpan, Michoacán
Footballers from Michoacán
Mexican footballers
Association football forwards
Irapuato F.C. footballers
Club Atlético Zacatepec players